Abu al-Barkat Majd ad-Din ibn Taymiyyah (1194 - 1255) was Muslim scholar muhaddith, theologian, judge, jurisconsult. He was a father of Shihab al-Din Abd al-Halim ibn Taymiyyah and the grandfather of Ibn Taymiyyah.

He was reputable scholars of the Hanbali school of law. He had two sons: Shihab al-Din Abd al-Halim ibn Taymiyyah (d. 1284) and Fakhr al-Din (d. 1225).

Biography
He was born in Harran in 590 AH. Harran was a city part of the Sultanate of Rum, now Harran is a small city on the border of Syria and Turkey, currently in Şanlıurfa province. At the beginning of the Islamic period, Harran was located in the land of the Mudar tribe (Diyar Mudar). Before its destruction by the Mongols, Harran was also well known since the early days of Islam for its Hanbali school and tradition, to which Ibn Taymiyyah's family belonged.

He taught Hadith in the Levant, the Hijaz and Iraq, and in addition to his country Harran in the Levant, he was a member of his time in the knowledge of the Hanbali school of thought. 
He was a disciple of ibn Gunaymah & Ibn Qudamah. He is known as ‘al-Majd’ in madhhab. In Hanbali fiqh, the designation ‘ash-Shaykhain” indicates to Imam ibn Qudamah and Imam Majd-ud-din Ibn Taymiyyah.

Books 
His notable works includes:  

1. An explanation of “al-Hidayah” 

2. “Al-Muntaqa fi Ahadith Al-Ahkam” was explained by Al-Shawkani titled ‘Nayl al-Awtar’

3. “Al-Muharrar fi Al-Fiqh”, which is more important in terms of the Hanbali jurisprudence- explained by many scholars including his grandson Ibn Taymiyyah- his explanation's title was ‘At-Taliq al-Mukarrar’, ibn Rajab and Ibn Abdul-Haq.

References

1194 births
1255 deaths
13th-century Muslim scholars of Islam
Atharis
Hanbalis
Scholars from the Mamluk Sultanate
Ibn Taymiyyah family